The Izvestiy TSIK Islands or Izvesti Tsik Islands, also known as Izvestia Islands, is an island group in the Kara Sea, Russian Federation.

Geography
The archipelago includes two large and two small islands covered with tundra vegetation, shingle and ice. It is located in the Kara Sea, about 150 km from the coast of Siberia and just 45 km north of the nearest island group, the Arkticheskiy Institut Islands.
The largest island is Troynoy with a length of 27 km.
The sea surrounding the Izvesti Tsik Islands is covered with pack ice in the winter and there are numerous ice floes even in the summer. The strait between Pologyy-Sergeyeva and Gavrilina Island is known as Proliv Belukha. The wholly submerged Sadko Shoal (Banka Sadko) is located roughly 30 km to the NE of Tupoy Point, Troynoy Island's easternmost headland.

This island group belongs to the Krasnoyarsk Krai administrative division of Russia and is part of the Great Arctic State Nature Reserve, the largest nature reserve of Russia.

The islands are a breeding ground for migratory birds during the brief summer season.

History
These islands were named after Izvestiya Tsentral'nogo Ispolnitel'nogo Komiteta, which was the full title of the newspaper Izvestia. A topographic survey of the islands was conducted in 1939.

There is a scientific station (Polyarnaya Stantsiya) on Troynoy Island that was founded in 1953. In September 2016 the weather station was encircled by about 10 adult polar bears as well as cubs, making it dangerous for scientists to exit. A nearby ship was able to deliver dogs and flares to the island, allowing the scientists, who had been trapped for two weeks, to scare off the bears.

See also
List of islands of Russia
List of research stations in the Arctic
Sadko (icebreaker)

Further reading
William Barr, Reinhard Krause and Peter-Michael Pawlik, The polar voyages of Captain Eduard Dallmann, whaler, trader, explorer 1830–96.

References

External links
Account of an expedition of amateur radio operators with photographs (Russian)

Archipelagoes of the Kara Sea
Populated places of Arctic Russia
Islands of Krasnoyarsk Krai